In fire protection engineering, the K-factor formula is used to calculate the volumetric flow rate rate from a nozzle. Spray nozzles can for example be fire sprinklers or water mist nozzles, hose reel nozzles, water monitors and deluge fire system nozzles.

Calculation 
K-factors are usually calculated in metric units internationally.

Metric units 

US customary units 
K-Factors have also previously been calculated and published using the United States customary units of pound per square inch (psi) and gallon per minute (gpm). Within the United States, US measurements are still often used instead of metric.

Unit confusion 
Care should be exercised not to intermix K-factors from metric and Imperial/US units, as the resulting factors are not equivalent or interchangeable. In case of mix-ups, results can be catastrophal.

References

Fire protection